Foresight (フォーサイト fuŏ̄saito) is a news magazine published in Japan by Shinchosha. The magazine focusses on Japanese politics and economic issues as well as Asian and international topics. It is known for representing non-Japanese expert voices.

History and profile
Foresight was first published in 1990 and covers mainly politics. The print edition was initially only available by subscription. At a later point some selected bookstores in major Japanese cities would also carry it. Print publication stopped in 2010. Since then it has been a web magazine. It is updated daily except of major holidays. The majority of the content is only available via subscription.

Non-Japanese authors include Nicholas Eberstadt, Robert Legvold, Uwe Parpart, Bruce Stokes, Ingo Günther,  Ethan Scheiner, Chris Kraul, Marcus Noland, Larry Wortzel, and Amanda J. Crawford.

Foresight also publishes e-books.

The magazine routinely informs about free as well as subscription-only articles via their Twitter feed.

Shigeto Uchikiba (内木場重人) was the editor-in-chief as of 3 April 2017.

References

External links

Print edition cover (2007)

1990 establishments in Japan
2010 disestablishments in Japan
Defunct magazines published in Japan
Magazines established in 1990
Magazines disestablished in 2010
Magazines published in Tokyo
Monthly magazines published in Japan
News magazines published in Asia
Online magazines with defunct print editions
Shinchosha magazines